Francesco Ferrari (October 15, 1905 – August 4, 1975) was a 20th-century Italian politician. He was a member of Christian Democracy.

References
Francesco Ferrari, su Senato.it - III Legislatura, Parlamento italiano.

1905 births
1975 deaths
People from the Province of Lecce
Christian Democracy (Italy) politicians
Senators of Legislature II of Italy
Senators of Legislature III of Italy
Senators of Legislature IV of Italy
Senators of Legislature V of Italy
Senators of Legislature VI of Italy
Politicians of Apulia